Felix Baumgartner (born 20 April 1969) is an Austrian skydiver, daredevil and BASE jumper. He is widely known for jumping to Earth from a helium balloon from the stratosphere on 14 October 2012 and landing in New Mexico, United States, as part of the Red Bull Stratos project. He became the first person to break the sound barrier relative to the surface without vehicular power on his descent. He broke skydiving records for exit altitude, vertical freefall distance without a drogue parachute, and vertical speed without a drogue.

Baumgartner is also renowned for the particularly dangerous nature of the stunts he has performed during his career. He spent time in the Austrian military where he practiced parachute jumping, including training to land on small target zones.

Biography 

Felix Baumgartner was born to mother Eva in Salzburg, Austria. His younger brother is Gerard. As a child, he dreamed about flying and skydiving. In 1999, he claimed the world record for the highest parachute jump from a building when he jumped from the Petronas Towers in Kuala Lumpur, Malaysia. On 20 July 2003, Baumgartner became the first person to skydive across the English Channel using a specially made carbon fibre wing. Alban Geissler, who developed the SKYRAY carbon fiber wing with Christoph Aarns, suggested after Baumgartner's jump that the wing he used was a copy of two prototype SKYRAY wings sold to Red Bull (Baumgartner's sponsor) two years earlier.

Baumgartner also set the world record for the lowest BASE jump ever, when he jumped  from the hand of the Christ the Redeemer statue in Rio de Janeiro.  This jump also stirred controversy among BASE jumpers who pointed out that Baumgartner cited the height of the statue as the height of the jump even though he landed on a slope below the statue's feet, and that other BASE jumpers had previously jumped from the statue but avoided publicity.

He became the first person to BASE jump from the completed Millau Viaduct in France on 27 June 2004 and the first person to skydive onto, then BASE jump from, the Turning Torso building in Malmö, Sweden, on 18 August 2006. On 12 December 2007, he became the first person to jump from the 91st floor observation deck of the then-tallest completed building in the world, Taipei 101 in Taipei, Taiwan.

Red Bull Stratos 

In January 2010, it was reported that Baumgartner was working with a team of scientists and sponsor Red Bull to attempt the highest sky-dive on record, using a helium balloon.

Test jumps 

It took Baumgartner about 90 minutes to reach the target altitude and his free fall was estimated to have lasted three minutes and 48 seconds before his parachutes were deployed.

Main jump 
The launch was originally scheduled for 9 October 2012 but was aborted due to adverse weather conditions. Launch was rescheduled and took place on 14 October 2012.

Baumgartner was in free fall for 4 minutes and 19 seconds, a fall time 17 seconds shorter than the previous record set during mentor Joseph Kittinger's jump on 16 August 1960. Kittinger was also his radio contact during the jump.

Two years and 10 days later Baumgartner's altitude record was broken by Alan Eustace.

Training for the jump 
Baumgartner initially struggled with claustrophobia after spending time in the pressurized suit required for the jump, but overcame it with help from a sports psychologist and other specialists.

Audi Motorsport 
In 2014, Baumgartner decided to join Audi Motorsport to drive an Audi R8 LMS for the 2014 24 Hours of Nürburgring after racing Volkswagen Polos in 2013. He underwent another intense physical and driver training session to prepare him for the race. He helped the team to a ninth place overall finish.

Personal life 
In October 2012, when Baumgartner was asked in an interview with the Austrian newspaper Kleine Zeitung whether a political career was an option for his future life, he stated that the "example of Arnold Schwarzenegger" showed that "you can't move anything in a democracy" and that he would opt for a "moderate dictatorship [...] led by experienced personalities coming from the private (sector of the) economy". He finally stated that he "didn't want to get involved in politics."

On 6 November 2012, Baumgartner was convicted of battery and was fined €1500 after slapping the face of a Greek truck driver, following a petty argument between the two men.

In January 2016, Baumgartner provoked a stir of critical news coverage in his home country after posting several critical remarks against refugees and recommending the Hungarian Prime Minister Viktor Orbán for the Nobel Peace Prize. Later on, Baumgartner endorsed the presidential candidate of the right-wing populist Freedom Party of Austria, Norbert Hofer. On 13 July 2016, Facebook deleted his fan page of 1.5 million fans. Baumgartner subsequently claimed that he must have become "too uncomfortable" for "political elites".

After Austrian authorities refused to grant sports tax breaks to Baumgartner, he moved to Arbon, Switzerland, whereupon his house in Salzburg and his helicopter were seized.

Baumgartner dated Playboy German playmate of the century Gitta Saxx. Later he was engaged to Nicole Öttl, a model and former beauty queen (Miss Lower Austria 2006). They broke up in 2013.

Since 2014, he has been in a relationship with Romanian television presenter Mihaela Rădulescu.

Awards and accolades 
 In 2012, he won the Bambi award  in the category of "Millennium".
In December 2012, Baumgartner was named one of "The Men of the Year 2012" by Top Gear magazine.
He was named Laureus World Action Sportsperson of the Year (12 March 2013).
He received the Mankind Award at The 2013 Spike Guys' Choice Awards.
Flying magazine ranked him number 46 on their 2013 list of "51 Heroes of Aviation"; he is the youngest living person on the list.
He became second in Most Stylish Men 2017 by Be Global Fashion Network.

See also 

 Space diving
 Eugene Andreyev — the former record holder for the longest-distance free fall jump.
 Michel Fournier — who has been working on a 25-mile (40 km) jump for several years.
 Nick Piantanida — flew highest balloon flight prior to Baumgartner:  in 1966.
 Project Manhigh — pre-NASA military project that took men in balloons to the middle layers of Earth's stratosphere. Participants set altitude and parachute jump records.
 Pyotr Dolgov — died in 1962 carrying out a high-altitude jump.
Charles "Nish" Bruce — In the early 1990s, Kittinger played lead role assisting him to break the highest altitude record. The project was suspended in 1994 following Bruce's mental health breakdown.
 Steve Truglia — English stuntman who was planning a similar jump.

Notes

References

External links 

Space Dive, BBC documentary about Baumgartner (2012), 60 minutes.
Video (03:14) – Felix Jump – Christ Statue – Rio de Janeiro – 9 July 2005.
Video (09:25) – Felix Jump – POV from Stratosphere (127,851 ft) – 14 October 2012.

 
 
 
 

1969 births
Living people
Austrian skydivers
Military personnel from Salzburg
Space diving
Austrian racing drivers
Austrian stunt performers
Flight altitude record holders
Laureus World Sports Awards winners
People from Arbon
Sportspeople from Salzburg
Phoenix Racing drivers
Nürburgring 24 Hours drivers